The 2021 Hungarian Grand Prix was a tennis tournament played on outdoor clay courts. It was the 19th edition of the Budapest Grand Prix, a 250-level tournament on the 2021 WTA Tour. It took place at Római Tennis Academy in Budapest, Hungary, from 12 through 18 July 2021.

Champions

Singles 

  Yulia Putintseva def.  Anhelina Kalinina, 6–4, 6–0.

Doubles 

  Mihaela Buzărnescu /  Fanny Stollár def.  Aliona Bolsova /  Tamara Korpatsch, 6–4, 6–4

Singles main draw entrants

Seeds 

 1 Rankings are as of 28 June 2021

Other entrants 
The following players received wildcards into the main draw:
  Dalma Gálfi
  Réka Luca Jani
  Panna Udvardy 

The following players received entry using a protected ranking:
  Ivana Jorović
  Kateryna Kozlova
  Anna Karolína Schmiedlová

The following players received entry from the qualifying draw:
  Jaqueline Cristian
  Olga Danilović
  Ekaterine Gorgodze
  Julia Grabher
  Tereza Mrdeža
  Paula Ormaechea

The following player received entry as a lucky loser:
  Martina Di Giuseppe

Withdrawals 
Before the tournament
  Magdalena Fręch → replaced by  Aliona Bolsova
 Polona Hercog → replaced by  Tamara Korpatsch
  Danka Kovinić → replaced by  Mayar Sherif
 Nadia Podoroska → replaced by  Ana Konjuh 
  Anastasija Sevastova → replaced by  Anhelina Kalinina
  Laura Siegemund → replaced by  Barbara Haas
  Patricia Maria Țig → replaced by  Martina Di Giuseppe

Doubles main draw entrants

Seeds 

1 Rankings are as of 28 June 2021

Other entrants 
The following pairs received wildcards into the doubles main draw:
  Dorka Drahota-Szabó /  Luca Udvardy 
  Natália Szabanin /  Amarissa Kiara Tóth

Withdrawals 
Before the tournament
  Naomi Broady /  Jamie Loeb → replaced by  Jamie Loeb /  Panna Udvardy
  Vera Lapko /  Tereza Mihalíková → replaced by  Ekaterine Gorgodze /  Tereza Mihalíková
During the tournament
  Timea Babos /  Réka Luca Jani
  Irina Bara /  Sara Errani
  Olga Danilović /  Ivana Jorović

References

External links 
 

Budapest Grand Prix
Budapest Grand Prix
Budapest Grand Prix
Budapest Grand Prix
Budapest Grand Prix